Fas or FAS may refer to:

Places
 Fez, Morocco, alternate spelling
 Poti, Georgia, a port city in Georgia

Businesses
 Fiat Automobili Srbija, Serbian automobile manufacturer
 Film Authors' Studio, Croatia

Organizations

In research and academia
 Faculty of Arts and Science (disambiguation), of several universities
 Federation of American Scientists
 Federation of Astronomical Societies (mainly UK)

In sport
 Football Association of Singapore
 Club Deportivo FAS, a Salvadoran football club

Other organizations
 Federal Antimonopoly Service, Russia
 Femmes Africa Solidarité, an NGO founded in 1996
 Foras Áiseanna Saothair (FÁS), Training and Employment Authority of Ireland
 Foreign Agricultural Service, US
 Salvadoran Air Force (Spanish: Fuerza Aérea Salvadoreña)

In science and technology

In biology and medicine
 Fas receptor or CD95, a receptor protein
 Fatty acid synthase, an enzyme
 Fetal alcohol syndrome
 Foreign accent syndrome, of a person speaking their own language

Other uses in science and technology
 NetApp FAS (fabric-attached storage), for computer data
 Feedback arc set, in graph theory
 Final assembly schedule, in manufacturing

Other uses
 Fas language of Papua New Guinea 
 A concept of ancient Roman religion
 Federal-aid secondary highway system of US Federal Aid Highway System
 Free African Society, an 18th-century African-American community
 Free Alongside Ship, an International Commercial Term
 Financial Assistance Scheme, a part of the UK welfare system
 Frankfurter Allgemeine Sonntagszeitung, a German newspaper
 Fellow of the Anatomical Society, of the UK

See also 
 Fass (disambiguation)
 Faz (disambiguation)